Yan Cleiton de Lima Razera (born 1 May 1975), simply known as Yan, is a Brazilian football manager and former player who played as a midfielder.

Playing career

Club
Born in Pinhalzinho, Santa Catarina, Yan finished his formation with Vasco da Gama. After making his first team debut in 1993, he was a regular starter in the following years before joining Internacional in 1996.

Yan signed for Fluminense in 1997, but was loaned to Coritiba in the following year. Back at Flu in 1999, he helped the club in their Campeonato Brasileiro Série C win and remained at the club until 2002.

After leaving Fluminense, Yan never settled for a club, representing Náutico, Flamengo, Al Khaleej, Grêmio, Avaí, Penafiel, Macaé, Jataiense, Bacabal (two spells), América de Natal, Tigres do Brasil and Votoraty. He retired with the latter in 2010, aged 35.

International
Yan represented Brazil at under-17 and under-20 levels, winning the 1993 FIFA World Youth Championship with the latter. He made his full international debut on 22 February 1995, replacing Souza in a 5–0 friendly routing of Slovakia.

Post-playing career
Immediately after retiring, Yan became Fernando Diniz's assistant coach at his last club Votoraty. After being Diniz's assistant at Botafogo-SP, he was named manager of São Pedro-RJ in the place of Valdir Bigode in March 2012.

Subsequently, Yan was a manager of Chapecoense's under-13, under-15 and under-17 categories. On 18 July 2021, he reunited with Diniz after being named his assistant at Santos.

Career statistics

Honours

Player
Vasco da Gama
Campeonato Carioca: 1993, 1994

Coritiba
Campeonato Paranaense: 1999

Fluminense
Campeonato Brasileiro Série C: 1999
Campeonato Carioca: 2002

Internacional
Brazil U20
FIFA U-20 World Cup: 1993

References

External links
Futebol de Goyaz profile 

1975 births
Living people
Sportspeople from Santa Catarina (state)
Brazilian footballers
Association football midfielders
Campeonato Brasileiro Série A players
Campeonato Brasileiro Série B players
Campeonato Brasileiro Série C players
Primeira Liga players
CR Vasco da Gama players
Fluminense FC players
Coritiba Foot Ball Club players
Clube Náutico Capibaribe players
CR Flamengo footballers
Khor Fakkan Sports Club players
Grêmio Foot-Ball Porto Alegrense players
Avaí FC players
F.C. Penafiel players
Macaé Esporte Futebol Clube players
América Futebol Clube (RN) players
Esporte Clube Tigres do Brasil players
Votoraty Futebol Clube players
Brazil youth international footballers
Brazil international footballers
Brazilian expatriate footballers
Brazilian expatriate sportspeople in the United Arab Emirates
Brazilian expatriate sportspeople in Portugal
Expatriate footballers in the United Arab Emirates
Expatriate footballers in Portugal
Brazilian football managers
Santos FC non-playing staff